Ruben Gerardo Barrera (born 3 February 1943) is a Mexican physicist, professor emeritus at the National Autonomous University of Mexico (UNAM). His main interest has been the optical properties of inhomogeneous systems.

Born in Mexico City, he studied at UNAM in Mexico City, graduating in physics in 1965. In 1971 he obtained a PhD in physics at the University of Illinois Urbana-Champaign. After a year's post-doctoral work at the University of Frankfurt (1972) and another at the Physikalisches Institut of the Rheinisch-Westfälische Technische Hochschule Aachen in Aachen (1973) he returned to UNAM in Mexico as an Assistant Professor in the Institute of Physics, where he has remained since then, being made full professor in 1984.

He was awarded the status of Fellow of the American Physical Society,  nominated by their Forum on International Physics in 2001 for his significant contributions to the understanding of the optical properties of surfaces and inhomogenous media, as well as for his leadership in the establishment and improvement of relations among physicists in the Americas, and for helping to create the Latin American Federation of Physics Societies. In 2004 he became a Fellow of the Institute of Physics. In 2012 he was awarded the National Prize of the Sciences and the Arts in the area of Physical, Mathematical and Natural Sciences by the Government of Mexico.

References 

1943 births
Living people
Scientists from Mexico City
20th-century Mexican physicists
National Autonomous University of Mexico alumni
Academic staff of the National Autonomous University of Mexico
University of Illinois Urbana-Champaign alumni
Fellows of the American Physical Society
Fellows of the Institute of Physics
National Prize for Arts and Sciences (Mexico)
21st-century Mexican physicists